SR Delémont is a Swiss football club based in Delémont and founded in 1909. It played in the Swiss Super League in the 2000–01 and 2002–03 seasons.

Current squad

Former players
See .

External links
  

Football clubs in Switzerland
Association football clubs established in 1909
Sr Delemont
SR Delemont